KZTV (channel 10) is a television station in Corpus Christi, Texas, United States, affiliated with CBS. It is owned by SagamoreHill Broadcasting, which maintains a shared services agreement (SSA) with the E. W. Scripps Company, owner of dual NBC/CW+ affiliate KRIS-TV (channel 6) and low-power dual Telemundo affiliate/independent station K22JA-D (channel 47), for the provision of certain services. The stations share studios on Artesian Street in downtown Corpus Christi, while KZTV's transmitter is located between Petronila and Robstown.

History
KZTV signed-on September 30, 1956 as KSIX-TV, the second VHF television station in the area behind former rival KRIS-TV by four months. It aired an analog signal on VHF channel 10 and was co-owned with KSIX radio. The station's call letters changed to the current KZTV on December 31, 1957. The channel has always been a CBS affiliate but shared secondary ABC status with KRIS-TV until KIII launched on May 4, 1964.

It was founded by Corpus Christi businessman Vann Kennedy, who also owned KVTV in Laredo. Prior to establishing the station, Kennedy worked for the International News Service in Austin and was known for hiring Walter Cronkite when he was a graduate student to work for him. Kennedy ran the station on a shoestring budget. He believed in giving anyone who wanted to learn the principles of good television journalism the chance to train on the job. As a result, over the years the station served as a training ground for recent college graduates.

Due in part to the extremely high turnover—even considering the size of the market—the station's newscasts were constantly at the bottom of the ratings. The notable exception was the noon news, which was anchored by Walter Furley from 1964 until his retirement in 2002.

Throughout the years, the station's resources were divided between studios in Downtown Corpus Christi and transmitter north of Petronila. In 1985, a modern production facility was built on Artesian Street in Downtown Corpus Christi. In 2002, Eagle Creek Broadcasting bought the station and later in the year debuted a new and more polished product. Most on-air staff hired before the buyout were forced out. During this time, KZTV went by the brands of "CBS 10" and finally Action 10 News. News directors included Judith Cutright (2002–2003), Kent Harrell (2003–2006), and Hollis Grizzard Jr. (2006–2009).

On July 23, 2008, Eagle Creek announced that it had sold KZTV to Cordillera Communications. To comply with Federal Communications Commission (FCC) rules, the license was instead sold to SagamoreHill Broadcasting; however, the application to sell the station was opposed by McKinnon Broadcasting, then-owner of KIII. This objection held up the deal until August 24, 2009 when Eagle Creek announced a shared services agreement with KRIS-TV. Cordillera acquired all station assets with Eagle Creek owning KZTV's broadcast license. SagamoreHill finally assumed ownership of the KZTV license on May 19, 2010. As of May 2011, KZTV has added HD recording capabilities to their syndicated programing which gives the station the ability to show syndicated programing in HD when the program is recorded in HD.

KZTV became the first station in the Corpus Christi market to broadcast news in HD on Monday, August 1 with its 5 p.m. broadcast.

On August 24, 2017, KRIS and KZTV began simulcasting together to provide full coverage of Hurricane Harvey with both news teams. This lasted until September 4, 2017, during this time period, KZTV anchors joined with KRIS anchors and the reporting staff combined for simulcasting. On September 5, 2017, KZTV resumed broadcasting its own news programming on its 5 p.m. broadcast.

On October 29, 2018, Cordillera announced the sale of its entire station group, including KZTV's SSA partner KRIS-TV, to the E. W. Scripps Company. According to the transfer of control application filed to the FCC, the SSA involving KZTV would be included in the deal. The sale was completed on May 1, 2019.

Programming

Syndicated programming
Syndicated programming on KZTV includes Entertainment Tonight, The Doctors, and Family Feud, among others.

News operation
After KRIS-TV's parent company bought out KZTV, KRIS-TV moved into KZTV's facilities in September 2010. Due to technical issues with the move of the station, KRIS-TV was not able to air newscasts from September 25 until September 28, and its reporters instead appeared on KZTV.

KRIS-TV unveiled a brand new high definition-ready set and graphics package on September 29, 2010. The station has now become the area's first to air newscasts in 16:9 enhanced definition widescreen. As of October 16, KZTV now simulcasts KRIS-TV's weekday morning, noon, and weekend broadcasts after dropping its own shows in those time periods. For the weekend newscasts, however, there could be preemptions on one channel due to network obligations.

KZTV currently broadcasts seven and a half hours of locally produced newscasts due to KRIS-TV's simulcasted weekday morning, noon and weekend broadcasts on KZTV.

Technical information

Subchannels
The station's digital signal is multiplexed:

Analog-to-digital conversion
KZTV shut down its analog signal, over VHF channel 10, on June 12, 2009, the official date in which full-power television stations in the United States transitioned from analog to digital broadcasts under federal mandate. The station's digital signal relocated from its pre-transition UHF channel 18 to VHF channel 10 for post-transition operations.

References

External links
 - KZTV 10
 - KRIS-TV 6

CBS network affiliates
SagamoreHill Broadcasting
E. W. Scripps Company television stations
Telemundo network affiliates
Television channels and stations established in 1956
ZTV
1956 establishments in Texas